Microphrys is a genus of crab in the family Majidae, containing the following species:.
Microphrys aculeatus (Bell, 1835)
Microphrys antillensis Rathbun, 1901
Microphrys bicornutus (Latreille, 1825)
Microphrys branchialis Rathbun, 1898
Microphrys garthi (Lemos de Castro, 1953)
Microphrys interruptus Rathbun, 1920
Microphrys platysoma (Stimpson, 1860)
Microphrys triangulatus (Lockington, 1877)
Microphrys weddelli H. Milne-Edwards, 1851

References

Majoidea
Taxa named by Henri Milne-Edwards